Bence Batik (born 8 November 1993, in Szeged) is a Hungarian football player. He plays for Puskás Akadémia in the Hungarian NB I.

Career

Ferencváros
He played his first league match in 2012.
On 2 April 2016, Batik became Hungarian League champion with Ferencváros after losing to Debrecen 2–1 at the Nagyerdei Stadion in the 2015–16 Nemzeti Bajnokság I season.

Puskás Akadémia
On 5 August 2022, Batik signed with Puskás Akadémia.

Club statistics

Honours
Ferencváros
Hungarian Cup: 2014–15, 2016–17
Hungarian League Cup: 2012–13, 2014–15
Szuperkupa: 2015

Honvéd
Hungarian Cup: 2019-20

References

External links
MLSZ 
FTC Official Site Profile

1993 births
Sportspeople from Szeged
Living people
Hungarian footballers
Hungary youth international footballers
Association football midfielders
Szombathelyi Haladás footballers
Szeged-Csanád Grosics Akadémia footballers
Ferencvárosi TC footballers
MTK Budapest FC players
Budapest Honvéd FC players
Puskás Akadémia FC players
Nemzeti Bajnokság I players
Nemzeti Bajnokság II players